Wicked Lips is the fifth extended play by Australian rapper Iggy Azalea, released on 2 December 2019 through Bad Dreams Records and Empire. Although it was initially announced to be a reissue of Azalea's second studio album In My Defense, it was revealed through the rapper's Twitter that her next musical project would be an extended play.

The extended play is supported by the lead single, "Lola", with British singer Alice Chater. Many delays happened within the EP's release with it being scheduled for release on 15 November, then on 22 November, but then it got delayed again until its eventual release on 2 December.

Background and release
After releasing her second studio album In My Defense on 19 July 2019 which peaked at number 50 on the US Billboard 200, Azalea stated that she would not be touring for the album and instead would be working on new music. She then announced the release of the extended play along with the release of the lead single "Lola" released on 8 November 2019. The extended play was set for release on 15 November 2019 but would be delayed two times for unknown reasons, before being officially released on 2 December 2019.

Singles
"Lola" featuring Alice Chater was released on 8 November 2019 and was sent to rhythmic and contemporary hit radio as the lead single on 3 December 2019. The single peaked at number 9 on the US Rap Digital Songs Sales Chart and number 84 on the UK Download Chart.

Critical reception

Mike Nied of Idolator points out that, "from start to finish, Wicked Lips is more proof that Iggy is doing things her own way. And that’s a very good thing. While 'Lola' is clearly the standout, every other track is a testament to her confidence and ability to craft bops." Daniel Spielberger of HipHopDX notices that "Azalea goes for a new approach: instead of getting bogged down by her past controversies, she dips her toes into various genres to see if she can regain her commercial mojo. But ultimately, the songs on Wicked Lips sound like skeletal homages to other artists' more interesting work" and concludes that, "though it's a slight improvement from her second album, Wicked Lips still shows that Azalea can't find her own lane. This EP has her settling for mediocrity and resting comfortably in the discount bin."

Track listing
Adapted from Apple Music.

Samples
"Lola" contains elements of "Mambo Italiano", Written by Bob Merrill, Frankie Laine, William S. Fischer.

Personnel

 Iggy Azalea – lead vocals
 Alice Chater – co-lead vocals (track 1)
 Pabllo Vittar – co-lead vocals (track 3)

Release history

References

2019 EPs
Albums produced by J. White Did It
Empire Distribution EPs
EPs by Australian artists
Iggy Azalea albums